Gymnospora is a genus of plants in the milkwort family (Polygalaceae) which is endemic to Brazil. It was first described as a subgenus of Polygala by Robert Chodat in 1891. It was separated into its own genera in 2013.

Species
As of August 2020, there are 2 accepted species:

Gymnospora blanchetti (Chodat) J.F.B. Pastore
Gymnospora violoides (A.St.-Hil. & Moq.) J.F.B. Pastore

References

Polygalaceae
Fabales genera